Big Prairie is an unincorporated community in northwestern Ripley Township, Holmes County, Ohio, United States.  It has a post office with the ZIP code 44611.  It lies less than one mile east of Odell Lake.

History
The first settlement at Big Prairie was made in the 1810s; the community was named for a big prairie near the original town site.

During the early 1900s Big Prairie was the home of the "Monitor Self Heating Sad Iron Co". The company was located at 459 Wayne Street, in Big Prairie, Ohio.   Their advertisement promised to "Make Ironing Easy and a Pleasure".

References

Unincorporated communities in Ohio
Unincorporated communities in Holmes County, Ohio